The 2010 Roewe Shanghai Masters was a professional ranking snooker tournament that took place between 6–12 September 2010 at the Shanghai Grand Stage in Shanghai, China.

Ronnie O'Sullivan was the defending champion, but he withdrew due to personal reasons.

Ali Carter won in the final 10–7 against Jamie Burnett.

Prize fund
The breakdown of prize money for this year is shown below:

Winner: £60,000
Runner-up: £30,000
Semi-final: £15,000
Quarter-final: £8,000
Last 16: £5,925
Last 32: £4,000
Last 48: £2,200
Last 64: £1,500

Stage one highest break: £400
Stage two highest break: £2,000
Total: £325,000

Wildcard round
These matches were played in Shanghai on 6 September 2010.

Main draw

Final

Qualifying
These matches took place between 2 and 5 August 2010 at the World Snooker Academy in Sheffield, England.

Century breaks

Qualifying stage centuries

 138  Liam Highfield
 136  Jamie Burnett
 135, 100  Jamie Jones
 132  Andrew Higginson
 129  Xiao Guodong
 120  Peter Lines
 114  Thanawat Thirapongpaiboon
 114  Liu Song
 111  Liu Chuang
 111  Judd Trump

 111  Joe Delaney
 109  David Morris
 107  Tony Drago
 105  Matthew Couch
 105  Joe Swail
 104  Anthony McGill
 103  Tom Ford
 103  Kyren Wilson
 101, 100  Michael White
 101  Matthew Stevens

Televised stage centuries

 142  Stuart Bingham
 135, 102  Judd Trump
 131  Jamie Burnett
 130  Tian Pengfei
 129, 103  Ali Carter
 114  Shaun Murphy
 109  Ken Doherty
 106, 105  Mark Selby

 106  Dave Harold
 105, 102  Mark Davis
 101  Marco Fu
 101  Martin Gould
 100  Mei Xiwen
 100  Stephen Maguire
 100  Jamie Cope
 100  Mark King

References

2010
Shanghai Masters
Shanghai Masters